Galway is a city in Ireland.

Galway may also refer to:

Places

Ireland
 County Galway
 Galway Bay

Sri Lanka
 Galway's Land National Park

United States
 Galway (town), New York
 Galway (village), New York

Constituencies
 Galway Borough (Parliament of Ireland constituency)
 Galway County (Parliament of Ireland constituency)
 Galway County (UK Parliament constituency)
 Galway Borough (UK Parliament constituency)
 Galway (Dáil constituency)

Other uses
 Galway (sheep), a breed of sheep
 Viscount Galway, a title
 Claddagh Ring or Galway, a type of wedding ring

People with the surname
 Albéric O'Kelly de Galway (1911–1980), Belgian chess player
 Henry Galway (1859–1949), British Colonial Governor
 James Galway (born 1939), Northern Irish flutist
 Joseph G. Galway (1922–1998), American meteorologist
 Martin Galway (born 1966), Northern Irish musician

See also
 Galloway, southwestern Scotland
 Galway Hooker, a type of sailing boat
 Mick Galwey, a former Irish rugby player and Gaelic footballer